NGRI may refer to:

National Geophysical Research Institute
Not guilty by reason of insanity, also known as insanity defense